Linzey is the family name of

Andrew Linzey (born 1952), English theologist and author
Clair Linzey, English theologist, animal ethicist and writer
James F. Linzey (born 1958), American theologist
Verna M. Linzey (1919–2006), American theologist

Linzey is the given name of

Linzey Cocker (born 1987), English actress